The World Para Alpine Skiing World Cup (previously called the  IPC Alpine Skiing World Cup) is an annual circuit of elite disabled alpine skiing competitions, regulated by the International Paralympic Committee (IPC) and the International Ski Federation (FIS).

Held at ski areas across Europe, North America, and East Asia, the World Cup consists of timed races in five disciplines: slalom, giant slalom, super G, downhill, and super combined. Medals are awarded to the top three men's and women's finishers in each of the three disability categories: standing, sitting, and visually impaired. After each race, points are awarded to the top 30 skiers in each disability category who finish within a certain percentage of the winning time.  100 points are awarded to the winner, 80 for second place, 60 for third, and so on, down to one point for 30th place.  In each disability category, the male and female athlete with the most points at the end of the season wins the overall World Cup title and a large glass trophy, the crystal globe.  Smaller globes are also awarded for athletes with the highest point totals in each of the five disciplines.  Additionally, a Nations Cup trophy is awarded to the country that accumulates the highest point total.

The World Cup is held every year, and is considered one of the premier competitions in disabled ski racing, along with the Winter Paralympics (held every four years, concurrently with the Winter Olympics) and the World Championships (held every two years since 2009, but irregularly before that). 

Disabled ski racers who aspire one day to compete on the World Cup attempt to qualify on one of the Continental Cup circuits: the Europa Cup (or "European Cup") in Europe and the Nor-Am Cup in North America.

History
Although disabled ski competitions date to the mid-20th century and the first Winter Paralympics were held in 1976, the Disabled Alpine World Cup is relatively new.  An unofficial circuit began in the late 1990s, and the first FIS-sanctioned World Cup race was held in Breckenridge, Colorado, United States in December 1999, with the first World Cup titles awarded in the spring of 2000.  In 2004, the administration of the World Cup circuit, and disabled ski racing in general, passed from the FIS to the IPC, although the FIS is still involved in some aspects of the tour.  For example, a FIS technical delegate still oversees each race.

Winners

Men

Women

Nations Cup

References

External links
 World Para Alpine Skiing - Schedule, results, rules and more

Alpine skiing competitions
Skiing world competitions
Parasports competitions